The Remixes is the first and only remix album by Colombian singer-songwriter Shakira, released on 21 October 1997, by Sony Music Colombia and Columbia Records. It is composed of remixed versions of tracks from her debut studio album Pies Descalzos, with which she attained Latin American success two years prior. While primarily a Spanish-language project, the album additionally contains re-recorded versions of songs in Portuguese.

Since its release, The Remixes has become one of the best-selling remix albums of all time, and is the best-selling Latin remix album worldwide, with international sales exceeding 500,000 copies. It was certified 2× Platinum for shipments of 200,000 copies by the Recording Industry Association of America (RIAA).

Track listing
All tracks produced by Shakira and Luis F. Ochoa.

Personnel

 Shakira – vocals
 Luis Fernando Ochoa – producer, mixer,  background vocals, guitar, keyboards, harmonica, percussion
 Alvaro Farfan – director
 Pablo Florez – remixing
 Jarvier Garza – remixing
 Victor Di Persia – recording engineer, mixer
 Camillo Montilla – engineer, piano
 Sonido Azulado – engineer
 Luly Deya – assistant engineer
 José Martínez – assistant engineer
 Freddi Niño – assistant engineer
 Juan Antonio Castillo – mixing
 Michael Fuller – mastering
 Howard Glassfor – guitar, vocals
 Gonzo Vasquez – programming, drums, percussion, background vocals
 Jose Gaviria – background vocals
 Andrea Piñeros – background vocals
 Jose Garcia – bass guitar
 Alejandro Gomez – harmonica
 Eusebio Valderrama – trumpet
 Samuel Torres – percussion
 Felipe Dothe – design
 Javier Hincapie – design
 Telma Ribeiro – graphic design
 Patricia Bonilla – photography
 Miguel Angel Velandia – photography

Charts

Certifications and sales

See also
List of best-selling remix albums

References

DJ mix albums
Shakira remix albums
1997 remix albums
1997 compilation albums
Spanish-language remix albums
Portuguese-language remix albums
Sony Discos remix albums
Sony Music Colombia remix albums
Columbia Records remix albums